Armando Theodoro Hunziker (August 29, 1919 in Chacabuco, Argentina – December 12, 2001 in Córdoba, Argentina) was an Argentine botanist.  He had specialized in the study of systems biology of the family Solanaceae, having contributed with a large number of investigations and publications.

Biography 
He was born to a Swiss Argentine family. An aunt taught him German, French, Italian and English.  He studied Agronomy at the University of Buenos Aires, where he met his mentor, Prof. Lorenzo R. Parodi, who supervised his graduate thesis about the genus Cuscuta, a parasite that affects wild and cultivated plants in Argentina and Uruguay.  At the age of 22, he received the first prize for his work ("Premio José Manuel de Altoaguirre") and one year later he received another prize ("Premio Eduardo Holmberg").

In 1945, at the age of 25, he was nominated curator of the Botanical Museum of the National University of Córdoba, recommended by the Nobel Prize winner in Medicine Bernardo Alberto Houssay.  Between 1949 and 1982 he was a professor in this university, having achieved the title of honored professor. In 1957 he received a prize from the National Commission for Culture for regional scientific production; in 1968 he received the "Weissmann Prize" and in 1983 the "Konex de Platino" prize.

He participated in the creation of the National Scientific and Technical Research Council where he worked as science and technology researcher, from 1963, as a member of the administration council in 1994 and as a senior researcher from 1998.

In 1961 he founded the Kurtziana journal, of which he remained the editor until 1998.

He worked abroad for several years.  Between 1947 and 1954 at Harvard University, he performed research with Irving Widmer Bailey.  In 1954 he worked under sponsorship of the British Council in the Royal Botanic Gardens, Kew, England.  From 1961 to 1962 and again from 1979 to 1980 he performed research in the United States, under sponsorship of the Guggenheim Foundation.

In 1999 he was diagnosed with cancer and suspended all his other projects, in order to dedicate himself to his main work, the book Genera Solanacearum: The Genera of Solanaceae Illustrated, Arranged According to a New System, which he managed to publish shortly before his death.

During his life he published more than 150 scientific papers and described a great number of plant species. Including Orchis kellerii , and Capsicum eximium .
One plant genus, Hunzikeria (in the family Solanaceae), also 11 species and one subspecies have been named in his honour.

Sources 

 Anton, Ana M. 2002. "Armando T. Hunziker (1919 − 2001)"; Taxon 51: 393-403.
 Hunziker, Armando T. 2001. The Genera of Solanaceae. A.R.G. Gantner Verlag K.G., Ruggell, Liechtenstein. .

External links

 Premios Konex 
 Anton A.M. & G.E. Barboza Armando Theodoro Hunziker Acta Horticulturae, ISHS
 Hunziker Juan H. 2000. Some historical aspects of plant cytogenetics in Argentina and Uruguay Genetics and Molecular Biology 23 (4): 917-920.
 Robertson Kenneth R.(Editor) 2000. "In Memoriam" ASPT Newsletter 16 (1).

1919 births
2001 deaths
Harvard University staff
Argentine scientists
Argentine people of Swiss-German descent